The Annals of King David (alternatively translated as the Chronicles of King David) is a lost work mentioned in the Hebrew Bible.

It may have been written by the Biblical prophet Nathan, who was one of King David's contemporaries.

Quotation

References

David
Lost Jewish texts